The Tins are an American indie rock band from Buffalo, New York.  The band is composed of Michael Santillo (vocals, keyboard), Adam Putzer (guitar, vocals) David Muntner (drums, vocals), and Justin John Smith (bass).

They are best known for their 2010 song, "The Green Room" off their debut, self-titled EP which was released through V2 Records. The band has since released an album, Life's A Gas and three additional EP's ("Young Blame", "Love on Strike", and "City Lies"). 

Their second full length album, eponymously titled The Tins, was released on June 1st, 2018. This album was followed up by the double A-side singles, "Saksaywaman / Open Minded" and covers, "Not A Second Time / Shelter From The Storm".

A short documentary about the band is slated for release in 2019.

Discography

Studio albums
 Life's A Gas (2012)
 The Tins (2018)

Extended plays
 The Tins (2010)
 Young Blame (2014)
 Love On Strike (2015)
 City Lies (2017)

Singles
 Friday Afternoon  (2016)
 Sundried Mind  (2018)
 Hear Me Out  (2018)
 Saksaywaman / Open Minded  (2018)
 Not A Second Time / Shelter From The Storm  (2018)
 Boulder Soul  (2019)
 City Lies II  (2019)
 Sooner Or Later  (2019)

References

Indie rock musical groups from New York (state)
Electronic music groups from New York (state)
Musical groups from Buffalo, New York
Psychedelic rock music groups from New York (state)